Piddington was a railway station on the former Bedford to Northampton Line.

History 
The line and station were opened in 1872 and operated by the Midland Railway which became part of the London Midland and Scottish Railway in 1923. The line closed to passengers in 1962. Until 1939 the western end of the line was at Northampton St Johns Street Station.That station closed in 1939 and the trains were diverted into Northampton Bridge Street Station and from there they ran into Northampton Castle Station.

For a short while from December 1892, Piddington and Horton were also served by the Stratford-upon-Avon and Midland Junction Railway, known as the "SMJR", with a station called Salcey Forest to the south west of Horton and south east of Piddington. This line ran from Towcester to Ravenstone Wood Junction on the Northampton to Bedford line between Piddington and Olney stations via Blisworth and Stoke Bruerne. There were connections from Towcester to Banbury and Stratford upon Avon.

Routes

Present day 
The station can be found off the B526 in Horton village. The route of the line is just to the northeast of the village. There is a proposal to reopen this line. Confusion sometimes occurs as there is a disused railway line close to Piddington itself, however that is the former Stratford and Midland Junction Railway, which had no station at Piddington or Horton except Salcey Forest referred to above.

References

Disused railway stations in Northamptonshire
Railway stations in Great Britain opened in 1872
Railway stations in Great Britain closed in 1962
Former Midland Railway stations
Hackleton